The 2022 Euro Winners Cup was the tenth edition of the Euro Winners Cup (EWC), an annual continental beach soccer tournament for men's top-division European clubs. The championship is the sport's version of the better known UEFA Champions League in association football.

Organised by Beach Soccer Worldwide (BSWW), the tournament was held in Nazaré, Portugal from 3–12 June.

The event began with a qualification round. The competition proper then commenced, with a round robin group stage. At its conclusion, the best teams progressed to the knockout stage, a series of single elimination games to determine the winners, starting with the round of 16 and ending with the final. Consolation matches were also played to determine other final rankings.

Kristall of Russia were the defending champions but were barred from entering the competition this year. The final was contended between two Portuguese clubs, Benfica Loures and Braga; the former won the competition for the first time, whilst the latter finished as runners-up for the third year straight.

Teams

Qualification 
Normal qualification rules returned having been suspended for the last two editions, due to the effects of the COVID-19 pandemic in Europe.

The amount of clubs which are entitled to enter automatically from each country depends on the perceived strength of their country's national league. BSWW determine the strength of each league by analysing the performance of all clubs in the EWC on a country-by-country basis over the previous five editions. A points-based ranking is produced from the data, as seen in the table below.

From the most recent edition of their country's national league:

 The first through sixth place performing nations can enter three clubs (league champions, runners-up and third-placed team).
 The seventh, eighth and ninth place performing nations can enter two clubs (league champions and runners-up).
 The tenth place and below performing nations can enter just one club, their league champions.

The above clubs take priority and are offered their country's slots first. However, if such clubs choose not to are or unable to participate, the slot is offered to the next highest placed teams from their league in turn until one accepts. Thus in reality, some countries fill their allocated quota with clubs placed considerably lower down in their league, don't fill all their slots, or sometimes fill no slots at all. 

The "host club" and defending champions also enter automatically.

Any and all clubs that don't qualify automatically, and/or are surplus to their countries allocated quotas, are entitled to enter the accompanying Euro Winners Challenge (preliminary round) to take place in the days prior to the competition proper, as a last opportunity to qualify for the EWC group stage; the best eight clubs will qualify.

 Portugal (POR): Portugal are entitled to one extra slot (+1) as the host nation.
 Russia (RUS): In accordance with sanctions imposed by FIFA and UEFA in response to the 2022 Russian invasion of Ukraine, clubs from Russia were disqualified (DQ) from entering.

Entrants 
60 clubs from 22 different nations entered the event – 32 entered straight into the group stage, 28 entered into the preliminary round.

La Louvière of Belgium originally entered but were subsequently replaced by Benfica Viseu of Portugal.

Key: H: Hosts \ TH: Title holders

Draw 
The draw to split the clubs 32 and 28 clubs into groups for both the group and preliminary stages respectively took place at 12:00 CEST (UTC+2) on 6 May at BSWW's headquarters in Barcelona, Spain.

Euro Winners Challenge (preliminary round)
The designation of "home" and "away" teams displayed in the results matrices is for administrative purposes only.

Matches took place from 3 to 5 June.

The group winners, plus the best runner-up, qualified to the competition proper.
Key

Group A

Group B

Group C

Group D

Group E

Group F

Group G

Group stage
Matches took place from 5 to 8 June.

The group winners, plus the six best runners-up (excluding the Challenge qualifiers groups), progress to the knockout stage. The statistically next best eight performing clubs recede to the 17th–24th place placement matches; the worst performing eight clubs recede to the 25th–32nd place placement matches.

Group A

Group B

Group C

Group D

Group E

Group F

Group G

Group H

Group I (Challenge qualifiers, Group 1)

Group J (Challenge qualifiers, Group 2)

Placement matches
Key

25th–32nd place

17th–24th place

Knockout stage
The draw for the round of 16, and allocation of ties to the bracket, took place after the conclusion of all group stage matches on 8 June.

 EW Challenge final

Round of 16

Quarter-finals

9th–16th place

1st–8th place

Semi-finals

13th–16th place

9th–12th place

5th–8th place

1st–4th place

Finals

15th place match

13th place match

11th place match

9th place match

7th place match

5th place match

3rd place match

Final

Awards
The following individual awards were presented after the final.

Top goalscorers
Players with at least five goals are listed; teams/players involved in the Euro Winners Challenge are not included.

17 goals
 Filip Filipov ( Husty)

14 goals
 Noël Ott ( Kfar Qassem)

13 goals
 Dejan Stankovic ( Alanya Belediyespor)

12 goals
 Filipe Silva ( Braga)

10 goals

 Eduard Suárez ( Levante)
 Axel Damm ( Copenhagen)
 Léo Martins ( Braga)

8 goals

 Jordan Oliveira ( Pisa 2014)
 Nelson Manuel ( Marseille BT)
 Bokinha ( Spartak Varna)
 Netinho ( West Deva)
 Duarte Vivo ( ACD O Sótão)
 Sven Körner ( Rostocker Robben)
 Sameh Moreb ( Kfar Qassem)

7 goals

 Daniel Valeš ( Slavia Prague)
 Nicolae Ignat ( Nistru Chișinău)
 Pablo Perez ( Huelva)
 Marian Măciucă ( Spartak Varna)
 Jérémy Bru ( Marseille BT)
 Fran Mejías ( Newteam Brussels)
 Benjamin Jr. ( ACD O Sótão)
 Eudin ( Alanya Belediyespor)

6 goals

 Michele Di Palma ( Pisa 2014)
 Kuman ( Grande-Motte Pyramide)
 Sebastien Groyne ( Newteam Brussels)
 Tim Kautermann ( Rostocker Robben)
 Patryk Pietrasiak ( Boca Gdansk)
 Cem Keskin ( Alanya Belediyespor)

5 goals

 Pavol Hrnčiar ( Husty)
 Lukáš Trampota ( Slavia Prague)
 Josep Jr. ( Pisa 2014)
 Francisco Casano ( Huelva)
 William Garcia ( Bemannia Stockholm)
 Konstantinos Tsitsaris ( Atlas AO)
 Cristian Torres ( Atlas AO)
 Duarte Algarvio ( Benfica Loures)
 André Pinto ( Benfica Loures)
 Chiky Ardil ( Benfica Loures)
 Alexandre Lança ( ACD O Sótão)
 Lukas Frandsen ( Copenhagen)
 Alejandro Sydney ( Boca Gdansk)
 Christoph Thürk ( Rostocker Robben)
 Joao Mota ( Sporting CP)
 Rui Coimbra ( Sporting CP)
 Glenn Hodel ( Levante)
 Soleiman Batis ( Levante)

Source: BSWW

Final standings

See also
2022 Women's Euro Winners Cup

References

External links 

 Euro Winners Cup 2022, at Beach Soccer Worldwide
 Euro Winners Challenge 2022 (preliminary round), at Beach Soccer Worldwide
 Euro Winners Cup 2022, at ZeroZero.pt (in Portuguese)

Euro Winners Cup
2022 in beach soccer
Euro
2022
Nazaré, Portugal
Euro Winners Cup